Emsworth is a borough in Allegheny County, Pennsylvania, United States, along the Ohio River. The population was 2,525 at the 2020 census.

Geography
Emsworth is located at  (40.512318, -80.095577).

Surrounding and adjacent neighborhoods
Emsworth has two land borders,  with Kilbuck Township from the west to the east and Ben Avon to the southeast.  Across the Ohio River's main channel, Emsworth runs adjacent with Neville Township.

Demographics

At the 2000 census there were 2,598 people in 1,153 households, including 642 families, in the borough. The population density was 4,519.1 people per square mile (1,759.8/km2). There were 1,228 housing units at an average density of 2,136.0 per square mile (831.8/km2).  The racial makeup of the borough was 94.42% White, 3.58% African American, 0.04% Native American, 1.15% Asian, 0.04% from other races, and 0.77% from two or more races. Hispanic or Latino of any race were 0.42%.

There were 1,153 households, 24.3% had children under the age of 18 living with them, 42.5% were married couples living together, 10.0% had a female householder with no husband present, and 44.3% were non-families. 38.7% of households were made up of individuals, and 10.9% were one person aged 65 or older. The average household size was 2.17 and the average family size was 2.94.

The age distribution was 23.7% under the age of 18, 6.6% from 18 to 24, 35.3% from 25 to 44, 21.0% from 45 to 64, and 13.4% 65 or older. The median age was 36 years. For every 100 females, there were 101.6 males. For every 100 females age 18 and over, there were 92.9 males.

The median household income was $39,028 and the median family income was $50,333. Males had a median income of $39,702 versus $24,224 for females. The per capita income for the borough was $19,471. About 2.9% of families and 5.4% of the population were below the poverty line, including 1.5% of those under age 18 and 6.4% of those age 65 or over.

Government and politics

Council members
 [2017–2019] Democrats: 1 (Lenz), Republicans: 0, Unknown: 4 (Petoski, Kenderski, Rumph, Lang)

See also
List of cities and towns along the Ohio River

References

External links

Pennsylvania populated places on the Ohio River
Populated places established in 1802
Pittsburgh metropolitan area
Boroughs in Allegheny County, Pennsylvania
1802 establishments in Pennsylvania